Dominique Jeremías Dean (born 29 September 1998), known as D.J. Dean, is a footballer who plays as a winger for Liga Nacional club Xinabajul. Born in the United States, he holds both American and Guatemalan citizenships.

Career
On 9 June 2018, Dean signed with United Soccer League side Tulsa Roughnecks.

On 4 January 2020, Dean joined Guatamalen side Antigua GFC.

On 29 July 2021, he made the move to Guastatoya.

References

External links
 

1998 births
Living people
People with acquired Guatemalan citizenship
Guatemalan footballers
Association football wingers
Antigua GFC players
Sportspeople from Tulsa, Oklahoma
Soccer players from Oklahoma
American soccer players
FC Tulsa players
USL Championship players
American people of Guatemalan descent
American sportspeople of North American descent
Sportspeople of Guatemalan descent
C.D. Guastatoya players